Peter Johnson is a British railway historian and author who specialises in books and articles on narrow-gauge railways. He is particularly associated with the Ffestiniog Railway.

History 
Johnson is a retired local government officer who lives in Leicester.

Johnson is known for his "meticulous research into all aspects of the [Ffestiniog] railway’s operation". He was a director of the Ffestiniog Railway Society from 1991 to 2003 and editor (originally jointly with Norman Gurley and Dan Wilson) of the Festiniog Railway Society Magazine from 1974 to 2003. In 2003 he was appointed the Festiniog Railway Company's official photographer.

From June 1995 until Match 2019, Johnson contributed a monthly column of narrow gauge railway news for Steam Railway magazine; as of September 2017 he was the magazine's longest serving continuous contributor. Since 2006 he has written obituaries of prominent railway people for The Guardian newspaper.

Works

References

External links
 Johnson's professional site

English non-fiction writers
Rail transport writers
Railway historians
Historians of technology
English male non-fiction writers
20th-century English historians
Living people
Year of birth missing (living people)
British people associated with Heritage Railways